The Dent d'Orlu, also known as the Pic de Brasseil (el. 2222 m) is a distinctive peak in the Pyrenees in the commune of Orlu in the Ariège department in southwestern France.

Pyrenees
Landforms of Ariège (department)
Mountains of Occitania (administrative region)